The tenth season of the long-running food reality television series Man v. Food premiered on September 6, 2022, at 9PM ET on the Cooking Channel, and is the sixth season of the show to be hosted by actor and enthusiast Casey Webb, who continues to travel to various local eateries in different cities before taking on a pre-existing food challenge in that city. Filming for season 10 took place in the fall of 2021.

The final season tally was 5 wins for Man and 5 wins for Food.

Episodes

References

Man v. Food
2022 American television seasons